Heather Phillipson is a British artist working in a variety of media including video, sculpture, music, large-scale installations, online works, text and drawing. She is also an acclaimed poet whose writing has appeared widely online, in print and broadcast. Her work has been presented at major venues internationally and she has received multiple awards for her artwork, videos and poetry. She is nominated for the Turner Prize 2022.

Exhibitions 
Phillipson has held solo exhibitions at major galleries and locations internationally, including the annual Duveen Galleries commission at Tate Britain in 2021 and the Fourth Plinth, Trafalgar Square, in 2020.

Other notable solo exhibitions include: a major commission for the 80-metre-long unused platform at Gloucester Road Underground Station for Art on the Underground (2018), Baltic Centre for Contemporary Art Gateshead (in 2018 and 2013), Screens Series, New Museum, New York (2016), Whitechapel Gallery London (2016), Schirn Frankfurt (2015–16), Performa New York (2015) and Dundee Contemporary Arts (2014). In 2014 she designed the stage for the Serpentine Gallery's Extinction Marathon. She has also presented works at many major biennials and festivals including a commission for Frieze Projects at Frieze Art Fair, New York (2016), São Paulo Art Biennial (2016), the Athens Biennale (2018), and the Sharjah Biennial (2019).

Her live events, which involve music, video, objects and speech, have been presented at venues including Tate Britain, the Serpentine Gallery, Palais de Tokyo, Whitechapel Gallery and the Institute of Contemporary Arts in London.

Phillipson's videos have been screened on BBC Two and Channel 4 television and her poems and audio collages have been broadcast on BBC Radio 3 and BBC Radio 4. 

Her works are held in a number of public collections including Tate, the Arts Council Collection and Castello di Rivoli, Turin.

In October 2021, Phillipson contributed to WWF's campaign, Art For Your World.

Early life and education
Heather Phillipson was born in 1978 in the borough of Haringey in North London and brought up in Greenwich, South East London. The youngest of three children, her mother was a social worker and feminist activist and her father a teacher, artist, jazz musician and writer. Phillipson and her siblings were raised with an interest in the arts and music and Phillipson, while still a child, was awarded Grade 7 from the ABRSM on both violin and piano. At the age of nine, Phillipson won a London-wide poetry competition for the borough of Lewisham. As a teenager, Phillipson and her family moved to West Wales, where Phillipson attended Ysgol Dyffryn Taf comprehensive school. She later went on to study Art & Design at Pembrokeshire College in the town of Haverfordwest where she also worked part-time in a record shop, building up her collection and knowledge of UK dance and electronic music, which later informed her practice as a DJ, playing house, jungle and drum and bass. Phillipson went on to become active in the late-90s UK rave and free party scene. As Phillipson has acknowledged, this has had a significant impact on the sampling, rhythmic and tonal structures of her work.

Personal life 
Phillipson lives in Hackney, East London, where her studio is also based.

Since 2016, she has volunteered as a mentor with Arts Emergency, a UK-based charity working to increase access to the arts for 16-19-year-olds from disadvantaged backgrounds.

Awards & Nominations 
2008: Eric Gregory Award for Poetry

2009: Faber New Poets Award

2013: Fenton Aldeburgh First Collection Prize (shortlist)

2013: Michael Murphy Memorial Prize (shortlist)

2014: Next Generation Poet

2016: Friends Prize for Literature, Poetry magazine, Chicago

2016: Film London Jarman Award for film and video art

2017: Selected for the Fourth Plinth, Trafalgar Square

2018: Ammodo Tiger Short Film Award, International Film Festival Rotterdam, European Short Film Award nomination from the European Film Academy
2022: Nominated for the Turner Prize

Publications 
Phillipson has published five volumes of poetry:

 Faber New Poets 3 (Faber and Faber, 2009)
 NOT AN ESSAY (Penned in the Margins, 2012)
 Instant-flex 718 (Bloodaxe Books, 2013)
 more flinching (Periplum Press, 2018)
Whip-hot & Grippy (Bloodaxe Books, 2019)

References

Further reading
Adrian Searle: Eggs on the Underground are a cracking joke, The Guardian, 7 June 2018: https://www.theguardian.com/artanddesign/2018/jun/07/heather-phillipson-review-eggs-sculpture-underground-gloucester-road-tube-london

Martin Herbert: CARDIAC UNREST, the work of Heather Phillipson, Artforum, February 2017: https://www.artforum.com/inprint/id=66063

Adrian Searle, Plinth perfect: the five contenders for the fourth Trafalgar hotspot, The Guardian, 19 January 2017: https://www.theguardian.com/artanddesign/2017/jan/19/plinth-perfect-the-five-contenders-for-the-fourth-trafalgar-spot

Adrian Searle, Jarman Winner Heather Phillipson…, The Guardian, 26 November 2016: https://www.theguardian.com/artanddesign/2016/nov/28/heather-phillipson-jarman-award-video-art-poetry

Nadja Sayej, At Frieze Projects, a Corporeal Rumination on the Art Fair’s Nervous System, Artslant.com, 6 May 2016: http://www.artslant.com/ny/articles/show/45779

Ben Eastham, The Woman Bridging the Divide between Art and Poetry, Heather Phillipson profile, New York Times, 13 February 2016: https://www.nytimes.com/2016/02/11/t-magazine/art/heather-phillipson-british-artist.html

Olivia Parkes, The Artist Creating a Walkway through the Digital World, Broadly, Vice, February 2016: https://broadly.vice.com/en_us/article/the-artist-creating-a-walkway-through-the-digital-world

James Bridle, Between Worlds: Labyrinthine associations and elastic meaning in the work of Heather Phillipson, feature, Frieze, January–February 2016: https://www.frieze.com/article/between-worlds

Elina Suoyrjo, The Mess of Getting Into It, interview with Heather Phillipson, n.paradoxa, issue 36, July 2015: http://www.ktpress.co.uk/nparadoxa-volume-details.asp?volumeid=36

Nathan Budzinski, Heather Phillipson, The Wire, January 2015, issue 372: http://www.thewire.co.uk/issues/372

Linsday Howard, Artist Profile, interview with Heather Phillipson, Rhizome, July 2014: http://rhizome.org/editorial/2014/jul/29/artist-profile-heather-phillipson/?ref=fp_post_title

Sam Buchan-Watts, Borders Become Flexi-Permeable, interview with Heather Phillipson, The Quietus, 3 November 2013: http://thequietus.com/articles/13755-heather-phillipson-interview-not-an-essay

Adrian Searle, Weird journeys with Heather Phillipson on the Tyne’s wild side, The Guardian, 27 June 2013: http://www.guardian.co.uk/artanddesign/2013/jun/27/heather-phillipson-baltic-adrian-searle

Carol Rumens, Poem of the Week: Heather Phillipson, The Guardian, May 2013: http://www.guardian.co.uk/books/2013/may/07/poem-week-relational-epistemology-heather-phillipson

Jonathan Gibbs, Book Design blog: Instant-flex 718, The Independent, April 2013: http://blogs.independent.co.uk/2013/04/19/friday-book-design-blog-instant-flex-718-by-heather-phillipson/ 

Helen Sumpter, Future Greats, Art Review, March 2013: https://artreview.com/features/66_future_greats_heather_phillipson/

1978 births
Living people
21st-century English women artists
Alumni of Central Saint Martins
Alumni of Middlesex University
Artists from London
English contemporary artists
English women poets
People from the London Borough of Haringey